Czechczery, or czekczery, were long trousers used by various Polish military formations in 18th and 19th century since the Great Sejm.

Variations 
Czechczery worn by soldiers of Polish-Lithuanian Commonwealth and Army of the Duchy of Warsaw were long, lose trousers while those worn by soldiers of the Army of Congress Poland were tight, tucked on boots, and fastened to the half of the calf.

Bibliography 
Leksykon wiedzy wojskowej by Marian Laprus, published by Wydawnictwo Ministerstwa Obrony Narodowej, Warsaw, 1979, page. 72. . (Polish)
Polski mundur wojskowy by Zdzisław Żygulski and Henryk Wielecki, published by Krajowa Agencja Wydawnicza, Kraków, 1988, page 411. . (Polish)

Trousers and shorts
Polish military traditions
Military uniforms